The 2013 Fórmula Truck season was the 18th Fórmula Truck season. It  begin on March 10 at Tarumã and ended on December 8 at Brasília. All ten rounds will count towards the Brazilian title, with four rounds counting towards the South American title.

Teams and drivers
All drivers were Brazilian-registered, excepting Alex Caffi, who raced under Italian racing license.

Notes

Calendar and results
A ten-round calendar was announced on 10 December 2012. All races were held in Brazil, excepting round at Autódromo Oscar Cabalén, that was held in Argentina.

Key:

Championship standings
Points were awarded as follows:

Drivers' standings

Brazilian

Notes:
1 2 3 4 5 refers to the classification of the drivers on the yellow flag scheduled, where bonus points are awarded 5–4–3–2–1 and the top five drivers in race ensures a place on the podium.

South American

Manufacturers' standings

Brazilian

South American

References

External links
 Official website of the Fórmula Truck (in Portuguese)

2013 in Brazilian motorsport
2013